Mubasir Khan (born 24 April 2002) is a Pakistani cricketer.

Early career 
Mubasir was born in Rawalpindi into a family involved in sports, his father being a former field hockey player while his elder brother Imran Khan has played cricket for Rawalpindi's U16 and U19 squads. His father encouraged him to go into cricket as well, which Mubasir began to take seriously in 2016, when he joined Asif Bajwa's academy, where Mohammad Amir also trained. Mubasir would then excel at U19 level before playing first-class cricket after being spotted by Northern's head coach Mohammad Wasim.

Domestic career 
In December 2020, he made his first-class debut for Northern, in the 2020–21 Quaid-e-Azam Trophy. In the second innings of the match, he scored his maiden century in first-class cricket, with 164 runs. The same month, he was shortlisted as one of the Men's Emerging Cricketer of the Year for the 2020 PCB Awards.

In January 2021, he was named in Northern's squad for the 2020–21 Pakistan Cup. He made his List A debut during the tournament. 

In December 2021, he was signed by Islamabad United following the players' draft for the 2022 Pakistan Super League. 

In December 2021, following the conclusion of the 2021–22 Quaid-e-Azam Trophy, he was named as the player of the tournament.

References

External links
 

2002 births
Living people
Pakistani cricketers
Islamabad United cricketers
Cricketers from Rawalpindi
Place of birth missing (living people)